The Battle of Neukalen was a battle at Neukalen of the Seven Years' War between Swedish and Prussian forces fought on 2 January 1762. The Swedish force under the command of Carl Constantin De Carnall managed to rout the Prussian forces under Wilhelm Sebastian von Belling positioned on a hill next to the town of Malchin. This was the last battle of the Swedish and Prussian troops during the war. The Swedes had a total of 4,000 men, in eight 8 battalions and several hundred cavalry. However, only the first line of 2,000 infantry (5 battalions) and 200 cavalry took part in the fighting. The Prussian force consisted of more than 2,000 men, in 5 battalions, 2 companies and a hussar regiment (10 squadrons). The Swedes had 37 killed and 137 wounded, while the Prussians had 50 killed, 120 wounded, and 180 captured.

Citations and sources

Citations

Sources

Försök till en Historia öfver det förra Pommerska Kriget: 1757 - 1762, Gustaf von Schantz

Battles of the Seven Years' War
Conflicts in 1762
1762 in the Holy Roman Empire
Battles involving Sweden
Battles involving Prussia
Battles in Mecklenburg-Western Pomerania